Nicholas Mark Horsfall was a British scholar of Latin literature. Educated at Peterhouse, Cambridge, and Corpus Christi College, Oxford, he worked as a lecturer at University College London, but retired in 1987. He was a specialist on the works of the Roman poet Vergil and published five commentaries (2000–2013) on individual books of his Aeneid. This series of commentaries was described by the Latinist James O'Hara as "one of the most remarkably productive and rich periods of publication of any modern classicist".

Life and career
Nicholas Mark Horsfall was born on 19 September 1946. His parents were Thomas and Sophie Mendelssohn-Horsfall. His father was a member of the Royal Navy and a descendant of the philosopher Moses Mendelssohn. Sophie, born Szapiro, came from a Jewish German-Russian background and had fled from Berlin to the United Kingdom in 1939. She worked as an interpreter of Russian for the BBC. Having been educated at Westminster School in London, Horsfall went on to study Classics at Peterhouse, Cambridge. In 1971 he earned a D.Phil. from Corpus Christi College, Oxford, with a dissertation on Book 7 of Vergil's Aeneid. His doctoral work was supervised by the Latinists R. A. B. Mynors, Robin Nisbet, and Margaret Hubbard.

In 1971, Horsfall began working as a lecturer at University College London, where he was influenced by the Latinists Otto Skutsch and  George Goold. In 1987, after being diagnosed with multiple sclerosis, he retired from teaching and moved to the Trastevere neighbourhood of Rome. After his return to the United Kingdom in 2000, Horsfall lived first near Oxford and then in Strathconon, a village in the Scottish Highlands. He had a stroke on 25 December 2018 and died 1 January 2019.

Work 
Horsfall specialised in the works of the Roman poet Vergil, whose Aeneid was the subject of his University of Oxford doctoral thesis; he published a commentary on Aeneid Book 7 in 2000, followed by Books 11 (2003), 3 (2006), 2 (2008), and 6 (2013)"one of the most remarkably productive and rich periods of publication of any modern classicist", according to the Latinist James O'Hara, who compared Horsfall to "taxing geniuses in other fields like Ted Williams, Neil Young, or John Ford." At his death he was preparing a commentary on Book 1. He also published three discursive books on Vergil: Virgilio: l'epopea in alambicco (1991, in Italian), A Companion to the Study of Virgil (1995, as the editor), and The Epic Distilled: Studies in the Composition of the Aeneid (2016). A selection of his papers was printed in 2020 by Oxford University Press: Fifty years at the Sibyl's Heels. Selected Papers on Virgil and Rome (ed. A. Crofts).

References

Bibliography 

1946 births
2019 deaths
English people of German-Jewish descent
British people of German-Russian descent
Alumni of Peterhouse, Cambridge
Alumni of Corpus Christi College, Oxford
British Latinists
Academics of University College London
People educated at Westminster School, London
British classical scholars
Scholars of Latin literature
Scholars of epic poetry